M'Bengue or M'Bengué is a Senegalese surname that may refer to
Alioune Badara M'Bengue (1924–1992), Senegalese politician 
Babacar M'Bengue (born 1991), German football player 
Cheikh M'Bengue (born 1988), Senegalese French football player 
Moussa M'Bengue (born 1955), Senegalese basketball player